Junazi (also Romanized as Jūnazi; also known as Jūnzhī) is a village in Karvandar Rural District, in the Central District of Khash County, Sistan and Baluchestan Province, Iran. At the 2006 census, its population was 28, in 4 families.

References 

Populated places in Khash County